{| 
{{Infobox ship image
|Ship image=
|Ship caption=The remains of the SS '’Kaffraria at Otterndorf, Germany
}}

|}
SS Kaffraria was a British cargo ship owned by Bailey & Leetham of Hull, England. She was built in 1864 by J. Laing & Son, Ltd., of Sunderland, England. She was originally built for the shipping company Ryrie & Company of London, which sold her to Bailey & Leetham in 1871.

Construction
Initially the ship was rated at 872 gross register tons, but this was increased in 1873 to 1,039 gross register tons. She was a single-screw schooner constructed of iron, with one deck with two tiers of beams, five cemented bulkheads, a well deck, and a double bottom aft. She had a four-cylinder compound engine which produced . The engine was built by the Humber Iron Works of Hull, England. Her Lloyd′s Register code letters were WFVQ  and her official number was 49917.

Wreck
While under the command of Captain W. Barron, Kaffraria'' ran aground in the River Elbe at Otterndorf, Germany, on 7 January 1891. The ship had a cargo of general export goods such as kitchen utensils, children’s toys, bundles of wool, hand tools, and all kinds of domestic appliances. Local residents quickly removed the cargo both legally and illegally. Later on 8 January, the ship sank. The wreck became a threat to shipping and was removed in 1984. The stern part of the ship with the rudder and screw can be seen today at Otterndorf.

References

Steamships
Victorian-era merchant ships of the United Kingdom
Maritime incidents in 1891
Shipwrecks in rivers
Shipwrecks of Germany
1864 ships
Ships built on the River Wear